Marhaši (Sumerian: Mar-ḫa-šiKI , Marhashi, Marhasi, Parhasi, Barhasi; in earlier sources Waraḫše. Akkadian: "Parahshum"  pa2-ra-ah-shum2-ki) was a 3rd millennium BC polity situated east of Elam, on the Iranian plateau, in Makran. It is known from Mesopotamian sources, but its precise location has not been identified, though some scholars link it with the Jiroft culture. Henri-Paul Francfort and Xavier Tremblay proposed identifying the kingdom of Marhashi with Ancient Margiana on the basis of the Akkadian textual and archaeological evidence.

History

The main inscription describing the rule of Lugal-Anne-Mundu of Adab in the 24th century BC mentions Marhasi among the seven provinces of his empire, between the names of Elam and Gutium: "the Cedar Mountains, Elam, Marḫaši, Gutium, Subartu, Amurru, Sutium, or the Eanna Mountain". The same inscription also recorded that he confronted  Migir-Enlil, the governor (ensi) of Marhashi, who had led a coalition of 13 rebel chiefs against him.

It is also recorded that the Awan kings of Elam were in conflict with a Sumerian ruler's attempt to seize the market at Warakshe, a kingdom apparently near Elam on the Iranian plateau, rich in luxury products of all types, especially precious stones. 

During the Akkadian Empire, Parahshum ("Marhashi" in Sumerian) was conquered by Sargon the Great, and king Abalgamash of Parahshum and his general Sidgau, along with Luh-ishan of Awan, rebelled unsuccessfully against Rimush, while Hishep-ratep of Awan in alliance with Warakshe was defeated by Naram-Sin.

King Shulgi of the Ur-III dynasty gave his daughter Nialimmidashu in marriage to king Libanukshabash of Marhashi in his 18th year, in an attempt to forge an alliance, but this proved short-lived, for Shulgi's successor Amar-Sin records having to campaign against their new king, Arwilukpi.

Hammurabi of Babylonia's 30th year name was "Year Hammurabi the king, the mighty, the beloved of Marduk, drove away with the supreme power of the great gods the army of Elam who had gathered from the border of Marhashi, Subartu, Gutium, Tupliash (Eshnunna) and Malgium who had come up in multitudes, and having defeated them in one campaign, he (Hammurabi) secured the foundations of Sumer and Akkad."

The name Marḫaši later reappears in a tablet from the Neo-Babylonian Empire, where it designates an area north of the Tigris-Euphrates valley, perhaps in Luristan, as conquered by Nebuchadrezzar II.

Rulers of Marhasi
The main rulers known from inscriptions are: c. 2550–c. 

 Migirenlil (c. 2550 BC)
 Unnamed King (c. 2325 BC)
 Abalgamash (c. 2316 – 2312 BC) revolted against Rimush, king of Akkad)
 Hubshumkibi (c. 2270 BC contemporary with Naram-Sin king of Akkad)
 Unnamed King (c. 2080 BC)
 Hashibatal (c. 2070 BC contemporary with Shulgi king of Ur)
 Arvilukpi (c. 2050 BC contemporary with Amar-Sin king of Ur)
 Pariashum (c. 2045 BC contemporary with Amar-Sin king of Ur)
 Libanugshabash (2044–c. 2033 BC)
 Mashhundahli (c. 2020 BC contemporary with Ibbi-Sin king of Ur)

Artifacts

See also
List of rulers of the pre-Achaemenid kingdoms of Iran
Jiroft culture
Meluhha
Aratta
Hamazi
Subartu

References

Literature
Potts, D. T., Total prestation in Marhashi-Ur relations, Iranica Antiqua 37 (2002).
 Olmstead, A. T., The Babylonian Empire, The American Journal of Semitic Languages and Literatures (1919), p. 72.
Michael Witzel, Substrate Languages in Old Indo-Aryan; 1.9. The Southern Indus language: Meluhhan, EJVS 5 (1999).
Bertrand Lafont, The Toponym Ligriki, Cuneiform Digital Library Bulletin (2002)
 Qashqai, Hamidreza, Chronicle of early Iran history, Tehran, Avegan press, 2011 (in Persian: گاهنمای سپیده دم تاریخ در ایران )

Elam
Jiroft culture
Former kingdoms